Beraba is a genus of beetles in the family Cerambycidae, containing the following species:

 Beraba angusticollis (Zajciw, 1961)
 Beraba cauera Galileo & Martins, 1999
 Beraba cheilaria (Martins, 1967)
 Beraba decora (Zajciw, 1961)
 Beraba erosa (Martins, 1981)
 Beraba grammica (Monné & Martins, 1992)
 Beraba inermis Martins & Galileo, 2002
 Beraba iuba Martins, 1997
 Beraba limpida Martins, 1997
 Beraba longicollis (Bates, 1870)
 Beraba marica Galileo & Martins, 1999
 Beraba moema Martins, 1997
 Beraba odettae Martins & Galileo, 2008
 Beraba pallida Galileo & Martins, 2008
 Beraba piriana Martins, 1997
 Beraba spinosa (Zajciw, 1967)
 Beraba tate Galileo & Martins, 2010

References

 
Eburiini